Shah Nikdur (Punjabi, Urdu:شاہ نکڈر)  is a small town in district of Sargodha, Punjab, Pakistan on the border between Sargodha and Jhang District. It is 26 km away from Sillanwali, and is a part of Sillanwali Tehsil.

Estimated population range of Shah Nikdur is from 50,000 to 60,000 peoples. Most of residents are migrated from India at the time of independence.

Description
The original name of Shah Nikdur was "Rudkin Shah" or "Radkin Shah". The town has a police station, post office, railway station, telephone exchange, civil hospital, basic health unit and United Bank.In 1926 The British Government approved Shah Nikdur as railway station.  The existing station upgraded & converted in to crossing line in 1990.  
Most of the people here belongs to Gujjar, Arain Sheikh, Bhatti community. Businesses activities are run by the Arain community. Population of said town & surrounding area is based on  refuges came from India during partition 1947.
A distributary link canal (Rajbah Norang) from Lower Jehlum Canal irrigates the land of this town. The nearby most populated village is 157 NB. Peoples living in the village are refuges of East Punjab (Gujjars, Rajpoots, Araiens & Sheikhs).Before partition there were two primary schools for  boys & girls,  later on upgraded to middle level, now both are Government High Schools. Students  qualified from these schools are serving in public as well as  private sectors in Pakistan  and abroad as Doctors, Engineers, Ambassadors, Accountants & Auditors . A Govt. College for Women is under construction. Recently established a private school named Dar e Arqam known as chak # 157 NB branch is also busy to educate new generation with Islamic education. It is backward are of District Sargodha. There is no such remarkable industry here. Controlled poultry Farm,  Oil Mill &  Rice mill situated in this town are main source of income of the poor working class.

The famous locally played games in Shah Nikdur are cricket and volleyball. Volleyball is much liked  among the youngsters, especially the peoples of Chak 157 NB. The Punjab Government has recently announced to rehabilitate & link the existing road with LHR- ISLD motorway through Kot Momin interchange. Approximately 100 KM  distance will come short in between ISLD - T T Sigh section via Jhang. This area will attract business community for major capital investment .

Agriculture 
Rice, Wheat and sugarcane are the town's major crops. A specific & large part of the population is involved in the agricultural sector. The town itself is surrounded by dozens of other small villages called chacks, which increase its attraction for traders and farmers.

Public transport
New Khan Transport Company has launched the best bus service to facilitate the public of this area. This bus runs through in between Shah Nikdur - Lahore via Sillanwali & Sargodha. Keeping in view the remarkable services & punctuality of said transport company, the peoples have named it as "High Court Time".

References

Shah Nikdur(157NB) produced high profile peoples working in public sector, private sector and abroad. Say Dr. Masood Ahmed, Dr. Abdul Jabbar, Ch.Abdul Rashid (USA), Ch. Abdul Shakoor ( Retired Judge) Ch. Mushtaq (Late) Judge, Ch. M. Aslam (Late) Msc Agriculture,   Ch. Mohammad Yousaf Sr. Audit Officer (Qatar), Ch. M.Yaseen (Qatar) M.Waleed Iqbal CA (UAE) and so many others.

Populated places in Sargodha District
Towns in Pakistan